Haleji Sharif is a village in Pano Aqil taluka, Sukkur district in Sindh, Pakistan.

Populated places in Sukkur District